Yuan Ye or Yuanye may refer to:

People
Yuan Ye (emperor) (509–532, "reigned" 531–532), puppet emperor of the Northern Wei dynasty
Yuan Ye (speed skater) (born 1979), Chinese speed skater
Yuan Ye (footballer) (born 1993), Chinese footballer

Others
The Craft of Gardens, 1631 Chinese book by Ji Cheng
The Wilderness (play), 1936 Chinese play by Cao Yu
The Savage Land (film), 1981 film adaptation of Cao Yu's play
The Savage Land (opera), 1987 Chinese-language western opera based on Cao Yu's play